Carlos Mencia: New Territory is a comedy album and Comedy Central  special by Honduran comedian Carlos Mencia recorded and released in 2011.

Track listing 

 Intro – 0:46
 What Happened to Us Mexicans? – 1:28
 Hispanic at the Disco – 3:50
 Mexicans at the Cookout – 2:43
 Mexican Christmas – 2:07
 JFK Would Have Been Hispanic - 8:30
 The 46 Types of Mexicans – 75:26
 Mexican Halloween – 10:58
 If The Avengers Happened in Honduras  – 0:59
 Mexican Hanukkah – 1:03
 George Lopez is Pissed Off At Me – 2:16
 Mexican Chinese New Year – 0:48
 Outro – 13:30

References

External links
Carlos Mencia's Official Website

Comedy Central Records live albums
Stand-up comedy albums
Stand-up comedy concert films
2011 live albums
2011 television specials
2010s comedy albums
2010s spoken word albums
Spoken word albums by American artists
Live spoken word albums